Paweł Urban (also spelled as Pawel L. Urban (Chinese name: 帕偉鄂本)) is a chemist and is a professor of Chemistry in the National Tsing Hua University (Hsinchu, Taiwan). He received his Ph.D. in Chemistry from the University of York (United Kingdom). Urban's research interests include mass spectrometry and biochemical analysis.

Academic activity
Urban is an inventor of the hydrogel micropatch sampling method, fizzy extraction, systems for imaging chemical reactions, and micro-arrays for mass spectrometry (MAMS). He co-authored a book on time-resolved mass spectrometry, and over 100 papers. Urban is editorial board member of Scientific Reports, HardwareX, PeerJ, and acted as a guest editor in Philosophical Transactions of the Royal Society A. His h-index is 31. He received the Ta-You Wu Memorial Award.

References

Living people
Alumni of the University of York
Taiwanese chemists
Academic staff of the National Tsing Hua University
Mass spectrometrists
Year of birth missing (living people)